The International Federation of Bakers, Pastry Cooks and Allied Workers' Associations was a global union federation bringing together trade unions representing bakery workers.

History
On 24 and 25 August 1907, an international congress of bakers was held in Stuttgart, and it resolved to form an international trade secretariat covering the industry.  Its headquarters were located in Hamburg, and it organised a second international congress in August 1910, at which the secretariat was re-organised as the "International Federation of Bakers, Pastry Cooks and Allied Workers' Associations", and it later became known as the International Federation of Bakers and Confectioners.

The federation's leadership decided it would be more effective if it merged with other secretariats in the food industry, and so in 1919 it organised a conference in Amsterdam on the topic.  The International Federation of Meat Workers and the International Federation of Brewery Workers attended, while the International Union of Hotel, Restaurant and Bar Workers and International Federation of Tobacco Workers did not.  In August 1920, the bakers' international merged with the meat and brewery workers, to form the International Union of Food and Drink Workers' Associations.

Affiliates
As of 1911, the federation had members in the following countries:

General Secretaries
1907: Oskar Allmann
1918: Josef Diermeier

References

Trade unions established in 1907
Trade unions disestablished in 1920
Global union federations
Bakers' and confectioners' trade unions